David Folsom (born March 12, 1947) is a retired United States district judge of the United States District Court for the Eastern District of Texas.

Education and career

Born in Murfreesboro, Arkansas, Folsom received a Bachelor of Arts degree from the University of Arkansas in 1969 and a Juris Doctor from the University of Arkansas School of Law in 1974.

He served as a school teacher at Arkansas Senior High School in Texarkana, Arkansas from 1969 to 1971.

He was in private practice in Texarkana, Texas from 1974 to 1995. He was a deputy prosecuting attorney of Lafayette County, Arkansas from 1978 to 1981.

Federal judicial service

On January 11, 1995, Folsom was nominated by President Bill Clinton to a seat on the United States District Court for the Eastern District of Texas vacated by Sam B. Hall, Jr. Folsom was confirmed by the United States Senate on March 17, 1995, and received his commission the same day. He was Chief Judge from 2009 to 2012. He retired on March 17, 2012.

References

Sources

1947 births
Living people
Judges of the United States District Court for the Eastern District of Texas
United States district court judges appointed by Bill Clinton
University of Arkansas alumni
University of Arkansas School of Law alumni
20th-century American judges
21st-century American judges